Beechwood Cemetery, located in the former city of Vanier in Ottawa, Ontario, is the National Cemetery of Canada.  It is the final resting place for over 82,000 Canadians from all walks of life, such as important politicians like Governor General Ramon Hnatyshyn and Prime Minister Sir Robert Borden, Canadian Forces Veterans, War Dead, members of the Royal Canadian Mounted Police, and men and women who have made a mark on Canadian history.  In addition to being Canada's National Cemetery, it is also the National Military Cemetery of Canada and the Royal Canadian Mounted Police National Memorial Cemetery.

Honours and designations
Beechwood has received various honours and designations because it is recognized as an example of 19th-century rural cemeteries and as a place of national significance and importance as a depository of Canadian history. It was designated as a National Historic Site of Canada in 2001. The cemetery has served as the National Military Cemetery of Canada since 2001 and has served since 2004 as the RCMP National Memorial Cemetery. Governor General Michaëlle Jean opened the Beechwood National Memorial Centre on 7 April 2008. In 2017, the Canadian Security Intelligence Service's National Memorial Cemetery was established at Beechwood.

Pipe Major Sgt Tom Brown is the "on call" piper for the National Military Cemetery at Beechwood where he can perform up to a dozen outdoor funerals a year.

Hall of Colours
When new colours (flags) are received or a unit is disbanded, colours are treated with utmost respect to military service and are never destroyed. After being carried on parade for the last time, the colour party presents the colours prior to the ceremony in which they are laid up for safekeeping in the Hall of Colours. Designed by Robertson Martin Architects, the Hall of Colours features a memorial stained glass window featuring an oak tree in leaf honouring Canadian military chaplains. The Hall of Colours was supported by a donation of $50,000 from Dominion Command of The Royal Canadian Legion.

The retired colours of Canada's army, air force and naval regiments are mounted at ceiling level in the Hall of Colours in the National Memorial Centre.
 Royal Canadian Navy's 30-year-old Queen's Colour (2008)
 2nd Battalion Royal 22e Régiment Queen's Colour and Regimental Colour
 2nd Battalion, The Royal Canadian Regiment Queen's Colour and Regimental Colour
 412 Squadron's retired Standard (2011)
 Royal Canadian Dragoons' 2nd. Guidon (2012)
 Les Fusiliers du St-Laurent (Queen's Colour and Regimental Colour – 2012)
 436 Transport Squadron's retired Standard (2012)
 400 Tactical Helicopter Squadron's Standard (2013)
 411 Tactical Helicopter Squadron's Standard (2013)
 3rd Battalion, The Royal Canadian Regiment's Regimental Colour (2014)

History

Since the North-West Rebellion of 1885, soldiers who were killed in the line of duty and war veterans have been buried in Beechwood Cemetery. The cemetery contains the National Military Cemetery which consists of two sections managed by the Commonwealth War Graves Commission, a Veterans Section owned by Veterans Affairs Canada and the National Military Cemetery of the Canadian Forces, created in 2001 and owned and managed by the federal Department of National Defence.

The first monument in the cemetery was erected by members of the 2nd Ottawa Field Battery in the 1870s. The sculptured sandstone cairn is dedicated to the memory of their former commanding officer, Lieutenant-Colonel John B. Turner. Erected in the 1870s by members of the 2nd Ottawa Field Battery, a sculptured sandstone statue on shaft is dedicated to the memory of a former commander, Captain James Forsyth.

The cemetery inspired a classic Canadian poem "In Beechwood Cemetery" by Archibald Lampman with its memorable final line, "They know no season but the end of time."

Moses Chamberlain Edey  designed the cemetery entrance gates in 1891.

The Commonwealth War Graves Commission is responsible for the graves of 98 Commonwealth (mainly Canadian) service personnel of World War I and 113 of World War II.  The commission also maintains the Ottawa Cremation Memorial, in a shelter adjoining the newer of the veterans' plots, which lists 26 personnel who were cremated in Canada and the US in World War II.

Noted for its Neo-Gothic architecture, the mausoleum at Beechwood was built by Canada Mausoleums Ltd. in the early 1930s. After a few years of operation, in a time of depression and financial difficulties, the mausoleum became the property of the cemetery. The building features stained glass windows designed by noted stained glass artist James Blomfield.

The Commonwealth War Graves Commission erected a memorial, known as a Cross of Sacrifice, incorporating a bronze sword inlayed in a granite cross in memory of the war dead buried in the cemetery's field of honour.

On 5 March 2009 Environment Minister Jim Prentice introduced legislation to designate Beechwood as the National Cemetery of Canada due to "its location here in our national capital, Beechwood serves as a focal point for our national memorial events, including Remembrance Day, and it is an appropriate place to conduct state burials." This was done to "serve as an important symbol of Canadian unity and pride and a means of preserving and promoting Canada's rich history and our diversity." The bill was passed on March 6. The bill received royal assent on April 23, 2009.

The multi-faith aspects include a monument to Our Lady of Fatima, Élisabeth Bruyère, St. Marie-Marguerite d'Youville, St. Charbel (for the Lebanese community) and a pagoda in the Chinese section of the cemetery and an Aboriginal Tribute Garden.

Interments

A full list of notable individuals buried at Beechwood can be found on the cemetery's website.

List by death year:

 Thomas McKay (1792–1855), businessman, a founder of the city of Ottawa
 Sir William Johnstone Ritchie (1813–1892), second Chief Justice of Canada
 Hewitt Bernard (1825–1893), lawyer, Father of Confederation
 Henry Wentworth Monk (1827–1896), Canadian Christian Zionist
 Thomas Fuller (1823–1898), architect, designer of the Parliament Buildings of Canada
 Archibald Lampman (1861–1899), poet
 Sir John George Bourinot (1837–1902), historian, political scientist, newspaper publisher
 Sir William McDougall (1822–1905), lawyer, politician, Father of Confederation
 Sir Henry Newell Bate (1833–1906), Canadian industrialist, first Chairman of the National Improvement Commission (National Capital Commission), founder of Beechwood Cemetery, Founder of All Saints Anglican Church (Ottawa) (All Saints Anglican Church (Ottawa))
 Andrew George Blair (1844–1907), statesman, Premier of New Brunswick
 Hod Stuart (1879–1907), ice hockey player, member of Hockey Hall of Fame
 Sir Sandford Fleming (1827–1915), engineer, inventor
 Wilfred Campbell (1858–1918), poet
 Sir Cecil Spring Rice (1859–1918), British Ambassador to the United States
 John Macoun (1831–1920), noted naturalist after which the Macoun marsh wild life area in the cemetery is named
 Arthur L. Sifton (1858–1921), statesman, Premier of Alberta
 John Rudolphus Booth (1827–1925), lumber tycoon
 James Creighton or J.G.A. Creighton (1850–1930), 'father' of organized ice hockey, law clerk of the Senate
 Frank Maurice Stinson Jenkins (1859–1930), founder, and the first captain of the Ottawa Hockey Club, orchestra conductor
 Sir George Eulas Foster (1847–1931), politician
 Charles H. Mackintosh (1843–1931), Lieutenant Governor of the Northwest Territories, 1893–1898, Member of Parliament, 13th Mayor of Ottawa, (1879–1881), owner/editor of the Ottawa Citizen (1874–1892)
 Sir Robert Borden (1854–1937), 8th Prime Minister of Canada
 Eddie Gerard (1890–1937), Hall of Fame ice hockey player
 Harvey Pulford (1875–1940), Hall of Fame ice hockey player
 Charles Stewart (1868–1946), politician, Premier of Alberta
 Duncan Campbell Scott (1862–1947), poet
 Percy Algernon Taverner (1875–1947), ornithologist
 John Duncan MacLean (1873–1948), teacher, physician, politician and the 20th Premier of British Columbia
 Faith Fyles (1875–1961) pioneering Canadian government female botanist and artist
 Henry Crerar (1888–1965), Canadian Army General and diplomat
 Andrew McNaughton (1887–1966), Commander-in-Chief Canadian 1st Army in WW II, statesman
 William Arthur Steel (1890–1968), Canadian radio pioneer
 Charles Foulkes (1903–1969), Canadian Army General, Chairman of the Chiefs of Staff, negotiated the WWII Nazi surrender in the Netherlands
 Harry L. 'Punch' Broadbent (1892–1971), Hall of Fame ice hockey player
 Clint Benedict (1894–1976), Hall of Fame ice hockey player
 Cecil Duncan (1893–1979), Canadian Amateur Hockey Association president
 Johnny Fauquier (1909–1981), Hall of Fame aviator, WWII hero, DFC, DSO
 Tommy Douglas (1904–1986), politician, voted "The Greatest Canadian"
 Hardial Bains (1939–1997), founder of the CPC (ML)
 Ray Hnatyshyn (1934–2002), statesman, Governor General of Canada
 Lou Lefaive (1928–2002), Canadian sports administrator and civil servant
 Nichola Goddard, MSM (1980–2006), CAPT, Royal Canadian Horse Artillery. First Canadian female soldier killed in action
 Maurice Nadon (1920–2009), former Royal Canadian Mounted Police Commissioner
 Mauril Bélanger (1955–2016), Member of Parliament for Ottawa—Vanier

See also

 List of national cemeteries by country

References

Bibliography

External links 

 Beechwood Cemetery Web site
 
 Beechwood Cemetery Burial Records, Monument Inscriptions and Interment Registry Indexes 1873–1997
 
 

Canadian military memorials and cemeteries
Cemeteries in Ottawa
National cemeteries
Commonwealth War Graves Commission cemeteries in Canada
National Historic Sites in Ontario
Tourist attractions in Ottawa
1873 establishments in Ontario
Cemeteries established in the 1870s